Korangi railway station 
(Sindhi: ڪورنگي ريلوي اسٽيشن) is  located in  Pakistan.

See also
 List of railway stations in Pakistan
 Pakistan Railways
Korangi
Korangi Town
Korangi District
Korangi J Area
Korangi Industrial Area
Korangi Creek Cantonment
Korangi (disambiguation)
Korangi railway station

References

External links

Railway stations in Karachi
Defunct railway stations in Pakistan